The 2001 East Carolina Pirates football team was an American football team that represented East Carolina University as a member of Conference USA during the 2001 NCAA Division I-A football season. In their tenth season under head coach Steve Logan, the team compiled a 6–6 record. The Pirates offense scored 421 points while the defense allowed 360 points.

Schedule

References

East Carolina
East Carolina Pirates football seasons
East Carolina Pirates football